The Fiancée of Belus is a painting by French artist Henri-Paul Motte based on a fanciful Babylonian ritual associated with the deity Belus (Bel). According to that ritual, Bel was offered a girl who sat on the lap of the Bel's statue overnight, and then was replaced by another, all of whom were the winners of daily beauty contests.  Motte cited as a reference the Greek historian Herodotus, but the related quote was later found to be invented. The Fiancee of Belus features oversized, Academic style. To recreate the interior of the Babylonian temple, Motte copied the Greek temple in Olympia, while the sculpture is inspired by Lamassu.

In 2013, the painting was acquired by the Musée d'Orsay where it is presently kept.

References

External links
Musée d'Orsay entry

Paintings in the collection of the Musée d'Orsay
Religious paintings
1885 paintings
Lions in art
Nude art